Scholastic probation, sometimes known as flunking out, is the formal warning that is given to students at a higher educational institution as the result of poor academic achievement. Normally, if students that are on academic probation does not quickly address their grades and improve their GPA to at least a 2.0, more serious consequences may occur, which is not limited to academic suspension.

Further reading

Examples of university regulations covering scholastic probation 
 
 
 
 

Higher education